Mitrohin, Mitrokhin (feminine Mitrohina, Mitrokhina) is a Russian patronymic surname derived from the first name "Mitroha", a diminutive form "Mitrofan". The surname may refer to:
Dmitry Mitrohin (1883–1973), Russian artist
Galina Mitrokhina (disambiguation)
Vasili Mitrokhin (1922–2004), major and senior archivist for the Soviet Union's foreign intelligence service, author of the Mitrokhin Archive
Mitrokhin Commission 
Sergey Mitrokhin (born 1963),  Russian politician and statesman

Russian-language surnames
Patronymic surnames